Agrimonia pilosa (Hangul: 짚신나물), also known as hairy agrimony, is a flowering plant in the family Rosaceae. It is distributed primarily over the Korean Peninsula, Japan, China, Siberia, and Eastern Europe.

Description 

Agrimonia pilosa is a perennial herb with erect stem growing  in height.  It grows along roadsides or in grassy areas at divers altitudes. It can grow in light sandy, loamy, or heavy soils.  Its suitable pH for growing properly is acid or basic alkaline soils.

It has many lateral roots and its rhizome is short and usually tuberous. Its stems are colored yellowish green or green and its upper part is sparsely pubescent and pilose, but the lower part had dense hairs. Its leaves are green, alternate and odd-pinnate with two to four pairs of leaflets. The number of leaflets reduces to three on upper leaves. The leaves are oval and edged with pointy teeth of similar size. And it is hairy on both sides.

Chemical constituents 
Agrimonia pilosa contains certain chemical components such as agrimonolide, coumarin, tannins, as well as flavonoids, phenylpropanoids, and triterpenes.

Traditional medicine 
Agrimonia pilosa is traditionally used in Korea for boils, eczema, and taeniasis (a tape worm condition). In Nepal and China, A. pilosa is traditionally used for abdominal pain, sore throat, headaches, and heat stroke.

References 

pilosa
Plants described in 1823
Flora of China
Flora of Japan
Flora of Korea
Flora of Russia
Medicinal plants of Asia
Edible plants